Ouroux-en-Morvan is a commune in the Nièvre department in the Bourgogne-Franche-Comté region in central France. In 2018, it had a population of 601.

Geography
Ouroux-en-Morvan, which covers an area of 60.56 km2 (23.38 sq mi), is part of Morvan Regional Natural Park.

See also
Communes of the Nièvre department

References

External links
Official website 

Communes of Nièvre